"Spirit Folk" is the 137th episode of the American science fiction television series Star Trek: Voyager airing on the UPN network. It is the 17th episode of the sixth season. Set in the science fiction universe of Star Trek, the titular USS Voyager spacecraft  is stranded on the other side of the Galaxy as Earth and the United Federation of Planets. In this installment, the crew go on an adventure in the holodeck, but things go wrong.

Some of the music in this episode by Jay Chattaway was nominated for an Emmy.

Plot
The crew continues to enjoy the Fair Haven holodeck program. After Lt. Tom Paris's suggestion, the holoprogram is set to run continuously, but over time, the strain put on the holotechnology begins to cause problems. The hologram characters gradually realise that the visitors can change their world at will (normally, holograms' programming makes them oblivious to non-in-world aspects). Frightened, the villagers begin to suspect that the crew are spirit folk that have come to destroy Fair Haven. Captain Janeway manages to elude her companion, Michael the barkeeper, but nevertheless asks Tom and Ensign Harry Kim to figure out the problem with the Fair Haven program. The two establish that the subroutines that make holograms unaware of anything outside their program have malfunctioned due to prolonged operation. When Tom and Harry enter the program to repair it, they are captured and held hostage by the holograms, who try to make Tom and Harry spill secrets about the spirit folks. The Doctor, in the role of the village priest, enters the holodeck using his mobile emitter to avoid being influenced by the damaged holoprogram. However the emitter is confiscated and he is held captive with Tom and Harry. Michael, determined to find "Katie" (Janeway), puts the emitter on. Janeway, thinking that it is the Doctor, orders him transported to the bridge. Janeway can no longer deceive Michael. She explains that her crew are on a spaceship and on a long journey. They enjoy the occasional visit to peaceful Fair Haven. They afterwards reenter the holodeck and convince the other characters that the crew has no hostile intentions.

Continuity
This story arc is begun in Season Six episode of Fair Haven, the first Voyager episode featuring the town.

Reception 
Some of the music in this episode, by composer Jay Chattaway, was nominated for an Emmy award.

In 2016, it was suggested viewing for Saint Patrick's Day due to its Irish content.

Den of Geek in 2016 made ranking of all 23 episodes written by Bryan Fuller for Star Trek up to that time, and placed this episode very last, remarking "“Spirit Folk” was pretty much just another episode where the holodeck malfunctions".

In 2017, this episode was rated the 10th worst episode of the Star Trek franchise up to that time, by Screen Rant. In 2018, CBR included this episode on a ranking of episodes of Star Trek, they stated were "So Bad They Must Be Seen" and noted it had not been received well by audiences.

In July 2019, ScreenRant ranked "Spirit Folk" as one of the top five worst of the series, noting that by this point the idea of self-aware holograms may have lost its freshness. In 2020, they went on to rank this episode as the sixth worst episode of Star Trek: Voyager, based on an IMDb rating of 6.3 out of 10 at that time.

In 2020, The Digital Fix said that "Fair Haven and its sequel Spirit Folk are perhaps the worst episodes of the seven year run" and remarking that Spirit Folk "is just as painful to watch". However, they did note it received an Emmy nomination for its music.

Releases 
This episode was released as part of a season 6 DVD boxset on December 7, 2004.

References

External links
 

Star Trek: Voyager (season 6) episodes
2000 American television episodes
Television episodes written by Bryan Fuller
Holography in television
Films scored by Jay Chattaway
Television episodes directed by David Livingston